WVIW is a Christian formatted broadcast radio station licensed to Bridgeport, West Virginia, serving North-Central West Virginia. WVIW is owned and operated by VCY America.

References

External links
 Official website
 

1992 establishments in West Virginia
VIW
Radio stations established in 1992
VCY America stations